Lim Jong-Chun (born 23 June 1978) is a South Korean former field hockey goalkeeper who competed in the 2000 Summer Olympics.

References

External links

1978 births
Living people
South Korean male field hockey players
Olympic field hockey players of South Korea
Male field hockey goalkeepers
Field hockey players at the 2000 Summer Olympics
2002 Men's Hockey World Cup players
Olympic silver medalists for South Korea
Olympic medalists in field hockey
Asian Games medalists in field hockey
Field hockey players at the 2002 Asian Games
Medalists at the 2000 Summer Olympics
Asian Games gold medalists for South Korea
Medalists at the 2002 Asian Games